Waigani is a suburb of Port Moresby in Papua New Guinea. It includes the Parliament Building of Papua New Guinea, the National and Supreme Court, the University of Papua New Guinea, Morauta House, the PNG National Museum, the National Library, British, Australian and New Zealand High Commissions and Japanese Embassy.

At the beginning of Papua New Guinea's self-government in 1973 and its independence in 1975 activities, including the original legislative building and the predecessor of the amateur state theatre and national and supreme court, were in downtown Port Moresby but new buildings were gradually established in Waigani to replace them, as has been the sport field where the Independence Day celebrations were held.

Tourism
Lamana Hotel

References

Suburbs of Port Moresby